KWNC (1370 AM) is a radio station broadcasting a talk format, simulcasting KKWN 106.7 FM Cashmere. Licensed to Quincy, Washington, United States, the station is currently owned by CCR-Wescoast IV, LLC.

The station came on the air in 1958 as KPOR, 1,000 watts, daytime only, licensed to Donald R. Nelson, and utilized an aluminum tower and a Collins 20V-1 transmitter.  Nelson, and his wife Ann, operated the station for over ten years from a building which formerly contained a bank. With the door welded permanently open, the station used the abandoned bank vault for a news room. KPOR serviced Quincy and the surrounding farming community with a country music format. During program testing prior to officially going on the air, a crop dusting airplane crashed into the tower's guy wires.  The tower crashed to the ground and, with some of the guy wires dangling from its wings, the plane made it safely back to its airport at Wenatchee, Washington.

References

External links

WNC
Mass media in Grant County, Washington
Townsquare Media radio stations